Benno Zech (5 October 1928 – 23 October 2022) was a German teacher and politician. A member of the Christian Democratic Union, he served in the Landtag of Rhineland-Palatinate from 1983 to 1987.

Zech died in Hambach an der Weinstraße on 23 October 2022, at the age of 94.

References

1928 births
2022 deaths
Christian Democratic Union of Germany politicians
Members of the Landtag of Rhineland-Palatinate
Recipients of the Order of Merit of the Federal Republic of Germany
People from Bad Dürkheim (district)